Ousmane is a given name or surname common in West Africa. It is derived from the Arabic name Uthman through Osman. People named Ousmane include:

 Mahamane Ousmane (born 1950), Nigerien political figure
 Ousmane Bangoura (born 1979), Guinean football midfielder
 Ousmane Cisse (born 1982), Malian professional basketball player
 Ousmane Dabo (born 1977), French football midfielder
 Ousmane Dembélé (born 1997), French footballer
 Ousmane Issoufi Maïga (born 1945), prime minister of Mali
 Ousmane N'Gom Camara (born 1975), Guinean football player
 Ousmane Niang (born 1980), Senegalese sprinter
 Ousmane Sanou (born 1978), Burkinabé football player
 Ousmane Sembène (1923-2007), Senegalese film director, producer and writer
 Ousmane Socé (1911-1974), writer, politician, and one of the first Senegalese novelists
 Ousmane Sy (born 1949), Malian politician
 Ousmane Tanor Dieng (born 1948), President of the parliamentary group of the Socialist Party of Senegal
 Ousmane Tounkara (born 1973), Canadian football player
 Ousmane Traoré (born 1977), Burkinabé football player
 Ousmane Zongo (1960-2003), Burkinabé arts trader

See also
 Ousmane (film), a 2021 Canadian short film

Surnames
Given names

fr:Ousmane